Hubert Druce (May 20, 1870 – April 6, 1931) was an English actor and producer involved with English and American theater for over forty years.

Druce was born as Benjamin Hubert Druce in Twickenham, Middlesex, England, in 1870.  His stage debut was at age 17 in Scotland in The Blue Bells of Scotland.  Richard Mansfield saw him play Gryphon in Alice in Wonderland two years later and took him to America where he first appeared in 1889 at Palmer's Theatre.  He then joined The Sign of the Cross touring company.  After some time in productions in New York and London, he appeared in New York in 1912 in The Perplexed Husband, and continued to act in New York and elsewhere in the United States.

Druce was appearing in The Admirable Crichton in March 1931 when he became ill.  He died of pneumonia in New York on April 6, 1931, survived by his wife and two children.

Actress Edith Ogilby Berg was previously married to Druce; they divorced in 1905.

References

External links

1870 births
1931 deaths
People from Twickenham
19th-century English male actors
English male stage actors
20th-century English male actors